Coeliades libeon, the spotless policeman, is a butterfly of the family Hesperiidae. The species was first described by Herbert Druce in 1875. It is found in tropical Africa, Mozambique, Zimbabwe and is an uncommon migrant to South Africa.

The wingspan is 45–52 mm for males and 50–55 mm for females. Adults are on wing from October to May in southern Africa and in the winter in subtropical areas.

The larvae feed on Drypetes (including Drypetes gerrardii), Cassia and Millettia species.

References

Butterflies described in 1875
Coeliadinae
Butterflies of Africa
Taxa named by Herbert Druce